Gooding Drive (state route 50) is a major road on the Gold Coast, Queensland. The road begins at the intersection of Hinkler Drive in Worongary where it passes over the Pacific Motorway and runs through the suburb of Merrimac before terminating in Carrara where it joins up with Nerang - Broadbeach Road (state route 90). As part of the most direct route from the Gold Coast Highway at Broadbeach to the Pacific Motorway it is a key component of Gold Coast infrastructure.

History
The road was probably named for the Gooding family, who ran a dairy farm in the area for many years.

Braeside, a home built early in the twentieth century, is on Gooding Drive. It now functions as a wedding and funeral centre.

Major intersections
The road is in the City of Gold Coast local government area.

See also

References

Roads on the Gold Coast, Queensland